Hernandia catalpifolia is a species of plant in the Hernandiaceae family. It is endemic to Jamaica.  It is threatened by habitat loss.

References

Hernandiaceae
Vulnerable plants
Endemic flora of Jamaica
Taxonomy articles created by Polbot